USS Mariner may refer to:

 , formerly the steam tugboat Jack T. Scully, was built in 1899 and delivered to the US Navy in 1917. She was lost at sea and stricken in 1918.
 , a steam tug, was built in 1906, and taken over by the US Navy in 1918. She was returned to her owner and stricken in 1919.

See also
 , a United States Army research vessel

United States Navy ship names